Anthene janna is a butterfly in the family Lycaenidae. It is found in Ethiopia, Somalia and north-eastern Kenya. The habitat consists of dry savanna.

References

Butterflies described in 1949
Anthene